Doug Gaynor (July 5, 1963) is a former American football quarterback.

College career
Gaynor played college football for the Long Beach State 49ers. Gaynor started for the 49ers in 1984 and 1985. In his two seasons, Gaynor threw for 6,793 yards while throwing 35 touchdowns and 35 interceptions. In 1985, Gaynor was named Pacific Coast Athletic Association Co-Offensive Player of the Year.

Professional career
Gaynor was drafted by the Cincinnati Bengals with the 99th pick in the 4th round of the 1986 NFL Draft. In his rookie year, Gaynor was the team's third-string quarterback and had three pass attempts.

References

External links
Pro Football Reference Page
College Football Reference Page

1963 births
Living people
Cincinnati Bengals players
Long Beach State 49ers football players
Players of American football from California
American football quarterbacks
Sportspeople from Fresno, California